Owen Von Richter (born April 7, 1975) is a Canadian former competitive swimmer who swam in the mixed-stroke medley events in international championships.  Von Richter represented Canada at the 2000 Summer Olympics in Sydney, Australia, where he placed 29th in the men's 400-metre individual medley event, clocking 4:25.70 in the preliminary heats.

He previously won a pair of bronze medals in the 200- and 400-metre individual medley events at the 1999 Pan American Games in Winnipeg.

See also
 List of University of Michigan alumni

References

1975 births
Living people
Canadian male medley swimmers
Michigan Wolverines men's swimmers
Olympic swimmers of Canada
Swimmers at the 1999 Pan American Games
Swimmers at the 2000 Summer Olympics
Swimmers from Calgary
Pan American Games bronze medalists for Canada
Pan American Games medalists in swimming
Medalists at the 1999 Pan American Games